The Hardanger Bridge is a suspension bridge across the Eidfjorden branch off of the main Hardangerfjorden in Vestland county, Norway.  The bridge connects the municipalities of Ullensvang and Ulvik. It replaced a ferry connection between Bruravik and Brimnes, and thereby shortens the driving time between Oslo and Bergen. It is the longest suspension bridge in Norway.

Construction
The bridge was approved for building by the Norwegian Parliament on February 28, 2006, and construction began on February 26, 2009. While the bridge was engineered by the Norwegian Public Roads Administration, the construction was done by MT Højgaard. The Administration is considering a different route over a future bridge as the main connection between East and West.

There are two driving lanes for cars with an  speed limit, and a separate lane for pedestrians and cyclists. The deck height means that the largest cruise ships cannot reach the inner Hardangerfjord any more.

The traffic predicted for the bridge was estimated to be 2000 vehicles per day. The opening of the bridge took place on 17 August 2013.

The main span is one of the longest suspension bridge spans in the world. It is also the longest tunnel to tunnel suspension bridge in the world.

Media gallery

See also
 List of longest suspension bridge spans

References

External links 

 Official home page
 Technical specifications brochure  (PDF)
 Hardangerbrua nytt reisemål  [The Hardanger Bridge, new travel destination]

Suspension bridges in Norway
Road bridges in Vestland
Norwegian National Road 13
Norwegian National Road 7
Toll bridges in Norway
Bridges completed in 2013